The MARA is a portable one-shot 78 mm unguided anti-tank weapon, designed and manufactured in Argentina by Fabricaciones Militares (DGFM). The solid rocket propulsion unit was developed by CITEFA.

History 

In the 1990s, the Argentine Army identified the need to replace obsolete short-range infantry antitank weapons in use, Such as the PDEF-40 rifle grenade, with a modern weapon similar to the AT4 locally developed and built,

The MARA Project was started by DGFM in the late 1990s, and in February 2005 the weapon was tested at the “Fábrica Militar Fray Luis Beltrán”.

Description 

The MARA is a weapon of 78 mm caliber with a fiberglass launcher tube 70 cm in length when transported that is extended to 1 meter when ready to fire. The launcher weighs about 4.2 kg, can be reused up to five times when using training ammunition, and is disposable when firing live ammunition.

The anti-tank projectile is fin-stabilized, and is propelled by the rocker motor to a speed of about 170 meters per second. It is able to penetrate 300mm of steel armor, and the sighting system's accuracy allows to hit 1 m2 target at a distance of 200 meters.

Specifications

Users 
 Argentine Army

See also 

 M72 LAW
 M80 Rocket Launcher
 RPG-18 / RPG-22
 RPG-76

References

Further reading 
 

Anti-tank rockets
Weapons of Argentina
Fabricaciones Militares